Sleaford in Hampshire, England is a hamlet of Headley  Civil Parish and the Northanger Ecclesiastical Benefice. It is in the civil parish of Whitehill

It lies on the A325 and B3004 roads where they cross the small River Slea, a tributary of the Wey. Since the road junction has been re-aligned, there are now three bridges across the river.

Sleaford is at the edge of Broxhead Common, a part of the belt of heathland on the Surrey-Hampshire border from Berkshire to West Sussex, which the British Army found attractive for training. There are numerous military colleges, camps and training grounds in the region which extends in a zone southwards from Windsor, through Camberley, Frimley and Aldershot to Bordon (near Sleaford), Woolmer and Longmoor Military Camp. The last two were set up to train engineers to run railways, a very important skill in the Great War period.

References

External links
Map of Kingsley Civil Parish. Sleaford is in the East.
The Kingsley Parish Council website.
Map of Headley Civil Parish. Sleaford is to the north-west.
A Headley web site.
About the old Kingsley church on the Kingsley civil parish web site.

Hamlets in Hampshire